The Dornier Do P was a German four-engined heavy bomber, manufactured by Dornier Flugzeugwerke in the 1930s. It was built as part of the secret rearmament of Germany, in opposition to the Treaty of Versailles.

Design and development
Construction of the Do P began in July 1929, and its first flight took place on March 31, 1930. The aircraft was tested in such places as Lipetsk. The Do P was a monoplane constructed mainly of metal, but covered in some places by fabric. The aircraft was powered by four nine-cylinder Siemens Jupiter VI, each with 530 horsepower. The aircraft had a crew of six. It was eventually developed into the Dornier Do 11.

Specifications

References

Do P
1930s German bomber aircraft
Four-engined push-pull aircraft
Aircraft first flown in 1930